Kaamasmukka (in Northern Sámi Gámasmohkki) is a small village in Finland in Lapland in the northernmost Finnish municipality of Utsjoki. It is located 27 km east of the village of Karigasniemi directly at the main road 92 (Kantatie 92) in the direction of the village of Kaamanen and there the Finnish national road 4 Helsinki-Utsjoki.

4 km southwest of the small village is the fell Kaktsvarri (in Northern Sámi Gákcavarri) with a height of 446 MASL.

Known people 
Ailu Valle (born 1984), Sámi rapper

Weblinks 

 Webpage of Karigasniemi village club

References 

Villages in Finland
Utsjoki